The 2020–21 season is the 6th season of Sudeva Delhi Football Club in existence and 1st season in I-League.

Team

First-team squad

Technical staff

Competitions

I-League

League table

League Results by round

League Matchdays

Statistics

Squad statistics

See also 

 2020–21 in Indian football

References

External links 

2020–21 I-League by team
Sudeva Delhi FC seasons